Robert Stirling Newall FRS FRAS (27 May 1812 – 21 April 1889) was a Scottish engineer and astronomer.

Life and work
Born at Dundee on 27 May 1812, Newall began work in a local mercantile office before leaving for London, where, in the employment of Robert McCalmont, he worked on a series of experiments on the rapid generation of steam.  He later spent two years promoting McCalmont's business interests in America.

In 1838, whilst L.D.B. Gordon was studying at the Freiberg School of Mines, Germany, he visited the mines at Clausthal, and met Wilhelm Albert. Impressed by what he saw, he wrote to Robert urging him to "Invent a machine for making wire ropes". On receipt of Gordon's letter, Newall designed a wire rope machine, consisting of four strands and four wires to a strand. On Gordon's return to the UK in 1839, he formed a partnership with Robert and Charles Liddell, registering R.S. Newall and Company in Dundee. On 17 August 1840, Newall took out a patent for "certain improvements in wire rope and the machinery for making such rope."

R.S. Newall and Company established a factory in Gateshead, England, and commenced making wire ropes for "Mining, Railway, Ships' Rigging, and other purposes". From this point forward, Newall was instrumental in developing substantial improvements to submarine telegraph cables, devising a method involving the use of gutta percha surrounded by strong wires.  The first successful cable, laid between Dover and Calais on 25 Sept. 1851, was turned out from his works, and he continued the manufacture on a large scale. In 1853 he invented the 'brake-drum' and cone for laying cables in deep seas. Owing to the scarcity of engineers competent to deal with the special difficulties of the work, Newall himself directed the submergence of many of his cables. Among these were the lines from Holyhead to Howth, Dover to Ostend, Malta to Corfu, besides several others in the Mediterranean, Suez to Aden, Aden to Kurrachee, Constantinople and Varna to Balaclava in 1855. Half of the first Atlantic cable was manufactured at his works. The last submarine line laid by him personally was that connecting Ringkjobing in Denmark with Newbiggen, Northumberland, in 1868.

Newall was a keen astronomer, and he commissioned Thomas Cooke to build a telescope for his private observatory at Ferndene, his Gateshead residence. For many years, the 25 inch refracting telescope was the largest in the world, and it was given to the Cambridge Observatory after his death in 1889. By the end of the 1950s, the telescope had fallen into disuse, and in 1958 it was donated to the National Observatory of Athens and it was placed at the Penteli Astronomical Station, just north of the city of Athens.

He was elected a fellow of the Royal Astronomical Society in 1864, of the Royal Society in 1875, and became in 1879 a member of the Institute of Mechanical Engineers. He was decorated with the order of the Rose of Brazil in 1872, and an honorary degree was conferred upon him in 1887 by the University of Durham. Newall married, on 14 Feb. 1849, Mary Pattinson, youngest daughter of Hugh Lee Pattinson FRS, with whom he fathered four sons and one daughter.  He is the father of Hugh Newall FRS.  Newall died at his home, Ferndene, on 21 April 1889.

References

External links
 Newall's own account of his early submarine cable work
 R.S Newall & Company and other early cable manufacturers
 The Newall telescope at the Penteli Observatory

1812 births
1889 deaths
Scottish astronomers
Scottish inventors
Fellows of the Royal Society
Scientists from Dundee
Engineers from Dundee